The Islander 24 Bahama, also called the Islander Bahama 24, is an American trailerable sailboat that was designed by Joseph McGlasson and first built in 1964.

The Islander 24 Bahama is a development of the 1961 Islander 24 which itself is a fiberglass development of the wooden-hulled Catalina Islander.

Development
McGlasson approached Glas Laminates to build a version of his wooden Catalina Islander in fiberglass. The mold was created by using the hull of one of the wooden boats and the resulting fiberglass boats retained the distinctive wooden board imprints from the mold. The 1961 Islander 24 features a trunk cabin, but the raised deck Islander 24 Bahama version proved a bigger commercial success and, as a result the Islander 24 had a relatively short production run.

Production
The design was built by McGlasson Marine/Islander Yachts in the United States from 1964 to 1970, with 500 boats completed, but it is now out of production.

Design
The Islander 24 Bahama is a recreational keelboat, built predominantly of fiberglass, with wood trim. It has a masthead sloop rig, a spooned raked stem, a raised transom, a keel-mounted rudder controlled by a tiller and a fixed fin keel. It displaces  and carries  of lead ballast. It has a raised deck which gives a cabin with greater shoulder room, rather than a trunk cabin.

The boat is normally fitted with a small  outboard motor for docking and maneuvering.

The design has sleeping accommodation for four people, with a double "V"-berth in the bow cabin and two straight settees in the main cabin. A galley was optional. The head is located in the bow cabin, under the "V"-berth.

See also
List of sailing boat types

Related development
Islander 24

Similar sailboats
Achilles 24
Atlantic City catboat
Balboa 24
C&C 24
Challenger 24
Columbia 24
Dana 24
MacGregor 24
Mirage 24
Nutmeg 24
San Juan 24
Seidelmann 245
Shark 24
Tonic 23

References

Keelboats
1960s sailboat type designs
Sailing yachts
Trailer sailers
Sailboat type designs by Joseph McGlasson
Sailboat types built by Islander Yachts